Team Wiesenhof was a professional continental cycling team based in Germany that participated in UCI Continental Circuits races and when selected as a wildcard to UCI ProTour events. The team was managed by Raphael Schweda with assistance from directeur sportifs Hahn Jochen, Markus Schleicher and Jens Heppner. In 2007 the main sponsor Wiesenhof pulled its sponsorship ending the team.

Final Roster (2007)

Major wins
Sources:

2001
  Overall Ringerike GP, Enrico Poitschke
Stages 3 & 5, Enrico Poitschke
 Stage 4 Peace Race, Enrico Poitschke
 Stage 2 Flèche du Sud, Enrico Nikola
2002
 ''No Recorded  Wins
2003
 Stages 5 & 7 Circuit de Lorraine, Björn Schröder
 Rund um die Hainleite, Enrico Poitschke
 Course de Solidarność et des Champions Olympiques
Stage 2, Eric Baumann
Stage 7, Roberto Lochowski
 Prologue Sachsen Tour, Roberto Lochowski
2004
 Peace Race
Stage 1, Lars Wackernagel
Stage 3, Sebastian Siedler
 Stage 5 Sachsen Tour, Björn Schröder
 International Hessen Rundfahrt
Stage 2, Roberto Lochowski
Stage 5, Sebastian Siedler
 Rund um die Nürnberger Altstadt, Sebastian Siedler
2005
 Stage 1 Giro del Capo, David Kopp
 Rund um Köln, David Kopp
 Stage 3 Bayern Rundfahrt, David Kopp
 Stage 3 Sachsen Tour, Björn Schröder
 Stage 6 Danmark Rundt, André Greipel
2006
 Stages 3 & 5 Giro del Capo, Steffen Radochla
 Stage 3 Istrian Spring Trophy, Gerald Ciolek
 Peace Race
Stage 7, Lubor Tesař
Stage 8, Torsten Schmidt
 Stage 2 Bayern Rundfahrt, Gerhard Trampusch
 Stage 3 Deutschland Tour, Gerald Ciolek
 Stage 3 Tour Poitou-Charentes en Nouvelle-Aquitaine, Steffen Radochla
 Rund um den Sachsenring, Artur Gajek
 Grote Prijs Jef Scherens, Marcel Sieberg
 Rund um die Nürnberger Altstadt, Gerald Ciolek
 Omloop van het Houtland, Artur Gajek
2007
 Veenendaal–Veenendaal, Steffen Radochla
 Stage 1 Critérium International, Olaf Pollack
 Stage 1 Bayern Rundfahrt, André Schulze
 Tour of Qinghai Lake
Stage 2, André Schulze
Stage 4, Jörg Ludewig
 Grand Prix de Fourmies, Peter Velits

National and World Champions
2006
  Road race, UCI Under-23 Road World Championships, Gerald Ciolek
2007
  Road race, UCI Under-23 Road World Championships, Peter Velits

References

External links
  

Defunct cycling teams based in Germany
Cycling teams based in Germany
Cycling teams established in 2001
Cycling teams disestablished in 2007
2001 establishments in Germany
2007 disestablishments in Germany